Trois crayons is a drawing technique using three colors of chalk: red (sanguine), black, and white. The paper used may be a mid-tone such as grey, blue, or tan. Among numerous others, French painters Antoine Watteau and François Boucher drew studies of figures and drapery aux trois crayons. The technique was, most notably, pioneered and popularised by the Flemish master Peter Paul Rubens.

Aux deux crayons uses only two colors, frequently black and white, as seen in many of Pierre-Paul Prud'hon's drawings.

Drawing